Stepanóvich (Russian, Belarusian) or Stepanovych (Ukrainian) is an East Slavic-language surname.

It corresponds to  Lithuanian Steponavicius and South Slavic Stepanović. It is a patronymic surname is derived from the name Stepán.

It should not be confused with the patronymic "Stepánovich". The two differ in pronunciation: the surname has an accent on the third syllable (second from the end), while the patronymic has an accent on the second syllable (as in the name "Stepán").

Notable bearers
Alex Stepanovich (born 1981), former American football center

See also
 

Russian-language surnames
Patronymic surnames